The 2020 Florida Mayhem season was the third season of the Florida Mayhem's existence in the Overwatch League and the team's first season under head coach Kim "KuKi" Dae-kuk. The Mayhem planned to host two homestand weekends in the 2020 season at the Watsco Center at the University of Miami and the Full Sail Live Venue at Full Sail University, but all homestand matches were canceled due to the COVID-19 pandemic.

The Mayhem opened the season going 7–4 heading into the May Melee tournament, where they reached the finals before being defeated by the San Francisco Shock. Florida finished the season with 14 wins, 3 bonus wins from midseason tournaments, and 7 losses to claim the fourth seed in the North America season playoffs. A 0–3 loss to the Washington Justice on September 12 eliminated the Mayhem from the North America bracket.

Preceding offseason

Organizational changes 
In early October 2019, Florida released assistant general manager Scott "Bearhands" Tester and promoted assistant general manager Andrew "yeHHH" Yeh to general manager. Assistant coach Kim "KH1" Hyung-il was released from the team a few days later. On November 20, Florida announced the signing of former RunAway coach Kim "KuKi" Dae-kuk as their head coach and former MVP Space coach Kim "Dox" Min-seok as an assistant coach.

For the 2020 season, the Mayhem debuted new colors, trading the yellow and red color scheme that the team had used for two years in favor of a 1980s Miami color scheme, featuring pink, teal, and black.

Roster changes 
The Mayhem enter the new season with no free agents, ten players which they have the option to retain for another year, and two players under contract. The OWL's deadline to exercise a team option is November 11, after which any players not retained will become a free agent. Free agency officially began on October 7.

On October 7, Florida announced that they would not pick up the team option for flex support Jo "HaGoPeun" Hyeon-woo, tank Yoon "Swon" Seong-won, substitute off-tank Koo "Xepher" Jae-mo, substitute support Park "RaiN" Jae-ho, and substitute DPS Choi "DPI" Yong-joon. Florida's first acquisitions of the offseason were announced on November 20, when the team announced the signings of DPS Kim "Yaki" Jun-ki and support Gang "Gangnamjin" Nam-jin from Korean Contenders team RunAway.

Roster

Transactions 
Transactions of/for players on the roster during the 2020 regular season:
On May 29, the Mayhem signed DPS Josh "Sideshow" Wilkinson on a 14-day contract.
On June 6, the Mayhem DPS transferred Josh "Sideshow" Wilkinson to the Los Angeles Gladiators.

Standings

Game log

Regular season

Midseason tournaments 

| style="text-align:center;" | Bonus wins awarded: 3

Postseason

References 

Florida Mayhem
Florida Mayhem
Florida Mayhem seasons